Nesto Group International is a multinational retail chain incorporated by Western International Group that operates a chain of hypermarkets and supermarkets (Nesto Hypermarket, Nesto Center) headquartered in Sharjah, UAE.

It was founded in 1999 by K. P. Basheer, Chairman of Western International Group in the United Arab Emirates and is led by Managing Directors Siddique Pallolathil, K. P. Jamal, and Directors K. P. Nawas, K. P. Noufal, K. P. Fayiz, and K. P. Athif.  

The company has 99 outlets operating hypermarkets, supermarkets and convenience stores across the Middle East and India while employing people of various nationalities.

The largest hypermarket of Nesto Group is situated in Deira, Dubai with a 350,000 sqft area.

Divisions

Nesto Hypermarkets 
Hypermarkets can go up to 3 levels and provides Electronics, home décor, fashion, baby care, lifestyle, fresh produce, daily essentials and International equipments.

Nesto Supermarkets 
Supermarkets can be up to 2 levels and cater fresh produce, groceries, and other household essentials.

Nesto Center 
A type of convenience store and is primarily engaged in the retail of food products which maybe fresh or packaged.

Nesto Ecommerce (Nesto Online) 
An online platform dealing with groceries, fresh produce, meat products and other household essentials.

Nesto Private Label 
Nesto Group has more than 100+ private label products.

Nesto Distribution Center FZCO
The warehouse is located in National Industrial Park, Dubai. It has about 500,000 square feet facility to integrate multi-level functions and operations.

The Distribution Center has 35 loading bays, pneumatic dock shelters and distributes to all Nesto outlets across the United Arab Emirates, Oman and Bahrain.

Foodbook Restaurant 
Foodbook is a multi-cuisine restaurant and is located in Al Rashidiya, Ajman and Muwaileh, Sharjah.

Nesto Central Kitchen 
This facility is located in Ajman and supplies cooked food items across all Nesto outlets in UAE.

Nesto Bakery 
Nesto Bakery is located in Ajman and supplies breads, cakes and other baked food.

Operating countries

References 

Supermarkets of the United Arab Emirates
Multinational companies headquartered in the United Arab Emirates
Emirati companies established in 2004
Organisations based in the Emirate of Ajman
Hypermarkets
Convenience stores